Thoothukudi Medical College, also known as TKMC, or Government Medical College Thoothukudi, is a medical institution in South India, located in the city of Thoothukudi, in the state of Tamil Nadu, India. The college is affiliated to The Tamil Nadu Dr. M.G.R. Medical University and is recognised by the National Medical Commission of India and World Health Organization.

History
The Government of Tamil Nadu established the Thoothukudi Medical College on 16 August 2000. It was initially located inside the campus of Fisheries College and Research Institute Department, Beach Road, then shifted to the 3rd Mile, Thoothukudi during the year 2001.

In July 2001, the first batch of 100 MBBS students started attending the classes in newly constructed building at 3rd Mile. Other departments like Pharmacology, Pathology, Microbiology and Social & Preventive Medicine started functioning in the subsequent years, and the District Headquarters Hospital was converted to Thoothukudi Medical College Hospital. The college was affiliated to The Tamil Nadu Dr. M.G.R. Medical University

College and location

The Medical College 

The Thoothukudi Medical College, along with its primary teaching hospital, is located at 3rd Mile in the city of Thoothukudi, in the state of Tamil Nadu, India. College Motto is Born to Serve. The college is present over a campus of around 25 acres close to Thoothukudi  Government Polytechnic campus and has well-equipped lecture halls, libraries, reading rooms, auditoria and separate hostels and mess for men and women. 

The college, the hospital and the hostels are all located within a radius of 1 kilometre. The college is located within about 5.1 kilometres from the Railway Station and 3.2 kilometer from the Bus Stand. The college on Google Maps

Courses offered

Undergraduate medical course

Post graduate courses

Super speciality courses

Diploma courses
 Diploma in Nursing (Three and a half years including six months Internship)
 Diploma in Medical Laboratory Technology (Two years)

Technician courses
Theatre Technician (1 Year)
Anaesthesia Technician (1 Year) 
Orthopaedic Technician (1 Year)
Emergency Care Technician (1 Year)
Respiratory Therapy Technician (1 Year)
Certified of Radiological Assistant (1 Year)

Other courses
Nursing Assistant Course (1 Year)

Admission
The college admits 100 students from 2000-2012 batch.  Recently 
the college admits 150 students  (Batch of 2013) to the MBBS course once every year based on neet mark . There are 15% seat reserved for all India quota and 85% reserved for state quota .

Departments
 ANATOMY
 PHYSIOLOGY
 Biochemistry
 PATHOLOGY
 MICROBIOLOGY
 PHARMACOLOGY
 FORENSIC MEDICINE
 General surgery
 General Medicine
 Ophthalmology
 OTORHINOLARYNGOLOGY
 Paediatrics
 Anaesthesia
 Venereology & Dermatology
 Thoracic Medicine
 Psychiatry
 Obstetrics and Gynaecology
 Orthopaedics
 Radiology
 Radiotherapy
 GENERAL Medicine
 Dentistry
 Neurology
 Gastroenterology
 NEUROSURGERY
 PLASTIC SURGERY
 MEDICAL ONCOLOGY
 PEDIATRIC SURGERY
 CARDIOLOGY
 NEPHROLOGY
 Anti Retro Viral Treatment Centre

Cultural events
Thoothukudi medical college hosts intra-college sports and cultural extravaganza events in the name of "RADIANCE" every year.

References

Medical colleges in Tamil Nadu
Education in Thoothukudi
Educational institutions established in 2001
2001 establishments in Tamil Nadu